Alumar is a village in Ancuabe District in Cabo Delgado Province in northeastern Mozambique.

References

External links
Satellite map at Maplandia.com

Populated places in Ancuabe District